"Six Pak" was a hit for The Revels in 1959. This was their first release.

Background
It was composed by Norman Knowles and other members of The Revels, Sam Eddy, Brian England, Dan Darnold and Jim Macrae.  It was released bw "Good Grief" on Lyn 1302 in October, 1959. Knowles had been inspired by Dan Darnold's reputation for drinking a beer in just four seconds. The track had party sound effects that would be used by The Revels in their other recordings. It became a hit in California. 

It was also released on Swingin' 620 in 1960. An alternative take of the track is featured on the  Sundazed Music 1994 CD compilation, Intoxica! The Best Of The Revels.

Releases

Singles
 "Six Pak" / "Good Grief" - Lynn 1302 - 1959 
 "Six Pak / "Good Grief" - Swingin' 620 - 1960

Compilations
 The Revels - Intoxica!!! The Best of the Revels
 Various artists - Hot Rockin' Instrumentals - Collector Records CLCD 4430

References

1959 songs
1959 debut singles
1950s instrumentals